Yarnkothrips is a genus of thrips in the family Phlaeothripidae.

Species
 Yarnkothrips kolourus

References

Phlaeothripidae
Thrips
Thrips genera
Taxa named by Laurence Alfred Mound